Mutwanga Hydroelectric Power Station, also referred to as Mutwanga Hydropower Station, is a   hydroelectric power station in the Democratic Republic of the Congo.

Location
The power station is located near the village of Mutwanga, on one of the rivers in Virunga National Park, in North Kivu Province, in eastern Democratic Republic of the Congo. The power station's location lies along the western slopes of the Rwenzori Mountains, close to the International border with the Republic of Uganda.

Overview
Mutwanga Power Station is a run of river, mini-hydropower plant, with installed capacity of 9.4 Megawatts. It is one of three mini-hydropower stations planned for construction in Virunga National Park, in North Kivu, in eastern DRC. The other two mini hydropower stations are the planned Lubero Hydroelectric Power Station, and Rutshuru Hydroelectric Power Station, currently under construction.

See also

List of power stations in the Democratic Republic of the Congo
List of hydropower stations in Africa
List of hydroelectric power stations

References

External links
  Approximate Location of Mutwanga Power Station At Google Maps

Hydroelectric power stations in the Democratic Republic of the Congo
North Kivu
Rwenzori Mountains
Virunga National Park
Energy infrastructure completed in 2013